Stanick Jeannette (born 6 March 1977) is a French former competitive figure skater. He is a two-time (2001, 2003) European bronze medalist, the 2000 Trophée Lalique silver medalist, and a two-time (2000, 2001) French national champion.

Personal life 
Jeannette was born on 6 March 1977 in Courbevoie, France. He and Audrey Ramonich have a daughter who was born on 1 April 2011.

Career 
Jeannette placed 13th at the 1992 World Junior Championships, held in November 1991 in Hull, Quebec, Canada. The following season, he began appearing also on the senior international level. He finished 18th at the 1993 World Junior Championships in December 1992 in Seoul, South Korea.

In the 1995–96 season, Jeannette continued competing both on the junior and senior levels. He won senior international gold medals at the 1995 Karl Schäfer Memorial and 1995 Ondrej Nepela Memorial before placing 13th at the 1996 World Junior Championships in November–December 1995 in Brisbane, Australia.

In the 1996–97 season, Jeannette began appearing on the ISU Champions Series (later known as the Grand Prix series). He won one Grand Prix medal – silver at the Trophée Lalique in November 2000. He won a bronze medal at the 2001 European Championships and another in 2003. He competed at three World Championships, placing as high as 7th (2000 Worlds).

Jeannette sustained a series of injuries, which eventually led to his retirement from competition. He has choreographed programs for skaters such as Florent Amodio and Miriam Ziegler.

Programs

Competitive highlights 
GP: Champions Series/Grand Prix

References

External links
 Stanick Jeannette - Official website
 

1977 births
French male single skaters
Living people
European Figure Skating Championships medalists
Competitors at the 2005 Winter Universiade